Iconography is the study of icons

Iconography may also refer to:
Iconography, a 1986 Bill Nelson (musician) album
Iconography, a 2009 Travis Dickerson album